The Gibson ES-125 is an archtop, hollow body electric guitar model that was produced by the Gibson Guitar Corporation.

Model history
Introduced in 1941 as the successor to the ES-100, the ES-125 was an entry-level archtop electric guitar. It had one P-90 single-coil pickup in the neck position, a single volume control and a single tone control. The pre-war model, discontinued in 1942, had a smaller 14.5" body. When reintroduced in 1946 it had the larger 16.25" wide body that the ES-150 had. The unbound rosewood fingerboard initially sported pearl trapezoid inlays; later, it would have dot inlays.

In the mid-1950s, the ES-125T was introduced, which was an entry-level thinline archtop electric guitar based on the original ES-125. It would later add options for double P-90 pickups and a sharp cutaway, referred to as a florentine cutaway, similar to the ES-175. Both the thinline and the regular models would be discontinued by the 1970s.

Specifications

1946
16" wide
Approximately 3.5" thick body
Scale length 24
One non-adjustable P-90 pickup with "dog ears"
Pickup in neck position
Tortoise grain pickguard
Trapeze tailpiece 
Single bound top and back
Pearloid circular fingerboard inlays
Silkscreen logo
Sunburst finish

1948
Dot fingerboard inlays

1950
Plain tailpiece
P-90 pickup with adjustable poles

Pickups and Components
The ES-125 was equipped with one P90 pickup. The original had 6 Alnico slug pole pieces. In 1950 the P90 transitioned to 6 adjustable poles between two Alnico 5 bar magnets.

The model used for the ES-125 has a string spacing on the neck pickup of 1" from high E to low E. The ES-125 also used a tapered dogear cover for their neck position pickups with a thickness of 4/16" on the treble side and 5/16" on the bass side. Since the fingerboard sits flush to the body (as opposed to an ES-175) the ES-125 requires a shorter neck pickup than a typical dogear. This pickup is, however, not as short as those found on an ES-330TD which has the pickup mounted flush to the end of the fingerboard.

Coils were wound to approximately 10,000 wraps although DC resistance of these pickups can vary greatly

Volume and tone controls were 500k Audio taper pots. A treble bypass cap value of .022 microfarads was used for the tone circuit. D (Double Pickup) models included a 3 position toggle switch to select each pickup individually or both pickups simultaneously.

Models
ES-125 Full depth, non-cutaway archtop with single P-90 pickup; produced from 1946-1970
ES-125D   Full depth, non-cutaway body with double p90 pickups (very rare; only a small number produced in 1957)
ES-125C   Full depth body with florentine cutaway; produced from 1965-1971
ES-125CD  Full depth body, double pickup (P-90) with florentine cutaway; produced from 1965-1971
ES-125T (T = Thinline body) non-cutaway; produced from 1956-1969
ES-125TD (D = Double p90 pickups) non-cutaway; produced from 1957-1964
ES-125TC (C = Cutaway) florentine cutaway; produced from 1960-1970
ES-125TCD (D = Double p90 pickups) florentine cutaway; produced from 1960-1970

Notable players 

 Tracy Chapman
 Bill Frisell
 BB King (early '50s)
 Jeff Mangum
 Jim O'Rourke
 Marc Ribot
 Daniel Rossen
 George Thorogood
 Jeremy Spencer
 Richard Clark
 Martijn van Iterson
 Thom Yorke
 Amber Rubarth
 Joe Buck
 Joe Pass
 Jimmie Vaughan
 Stevie Ray Vaughan
 Otomo Yoshihide
 Lenny Breau
 D. Boon

 Fenton Robinson
 Devon Sproule

References

Semi-acoustic guitars
ES-125